The International Association for Dance Medicine & Science (IADMS) was formed in 1990 with the goal summarized in its mission statement: IADMS is an inclusive organization for professionals who care for those who dance by evolving best practices in dance science, education, research, and medical care to support optimal health, well-being, training, and performance.

As at 2020, the association had a membership of over 1,500 from over 52 countries.

Since its inception, the association has held an annual meeting (scientific conference) at venues around the world. These conferences, currently four days in length, are multidisciplinary, with lectures, symposia, and forums on dance medicine, dance science, and dance education, as well as movement sessions. The conferences are attended by physicians, physical therapists, allied health professionals, alternative healthcare practitioners, psychologists, arts administrators, artistic directors, choreographers, dance educators, dance scientists, movement specialists, and dancers. Continuing education credits for healthcare professionals are provided.

The association publishes a quarterly peer-reviewed scientific journal, Journal of Dance Medicine & Science (by subscription, print and online) which is indexed in MEDLINE and The IADMS Bulletin for Teachers (free, online only).

Resource papers on numerous topics and in several languages, written by medical, scientific, and dance professionals, are available for free download on the association's website.

Presidents
 1991–1993 Justin Howse, FRCS (Eng) and Allan Ryan, MD
 1993–1997 Jan Dunn, MS
 1997–1999 Robert Stephens, PhD
 1999–2001 Marika Molnar, PT
 2001–2003 David S. Weiss, MD, FAAOS
 2003–2005 Rachel Rist, MA
 2005–2007 Virginia Wilmerding, PhD
 2007–2009 Boni Rietveld, MD
 2009–2011 Tom Welsh, PhD
 2011–2013 Emma Redding, PhD
 2013–2015 Janet Karin
 2015–2017 Matthew Wyon, PhD
 2017–2019 Peter Lavine, MD
 2019–2021 Peter Lewton-Brain, DO, MA
 2021-2023 Nancy Kadel, MD
 2023-2025 Kathleen Davenport, MD

References

Dance organizations
International medical and health organizations
Dance and health